Aidan Apodaca (born May 24, 1996) is an American soccer player who currently plays for USL Championship side Charleston Battery.

Career

College
Apodaca spent his entire college career at California Baptist University. He made a total of 68 appearances for the Lancers and tallied 48 goals and 12 assists.

While at the college, Apodaca played for Premier Development League side Southern California Seahorses, during their 2016 season.

Professional
On January 21, 2018, Apodaca was selected 55th overall in the 2018 MLS SuperDraft by the Philadelphia Union. On February 21, 2018, he signed with Philadelphia's USL affiliate side Bethlehem Steel FC. Bethlehem Steel released Apodaca at the end of the 2018 season.

On March 7, 2019, Apodaca joined USL Championship side, Reno 1868 FC. Reno folded their team on November 6, 2020, due to the financial impact of the COVID-19 pandemic.

On January 5, 2021, Apodaca signed with USL Championship club, El Paso Locomotive. On July 8, 2021, Apodaca was loaned to Orange County SC in July 2021. He joined Orange County SC on loan for the remainder of the season.

Apodaca joined USL Championship club, Charleston Battery, on January 5, 2022. He scored six goals and tallied 32 chances created, while playing in the most regular-season matches for the club (33), and was subsequently re-signed for the 2023 season.

References

External links
CBU bio

Bethlehem Steel bio

1996 births
Living people
American soccer players
Association football forwards
Charleston Battery players
El Paso Locomotive FC players
Orange County SC players
Philadelphia Union II players
Reno 1868 FC players
California Baptist Lancers men's soccer players
People from Rancho Cucamonga, California
Philadelphia Union draft picks
Soccer players from California
Southern California Seahorses players
Sportspeople from San Bernardino County, California
USL Championship players
USL League Two players